Étienne Crétu was an 18th-19th-century French playwright.

The son of Anthelme Crétu, managing director of the Théâtre des Variétés who associated him to the direction, his plays were presented in this theatre from 1801 to 1828.

Works 
1785: Les Deux gendres, comedy in five acts and in verse
1799: Pygmalion à Saint-Maur, farce-anecdotique in one actand vaudevilles, with François Bernard-Valville and Étienne Gosse
1801: Quel est le plus ridicule ? ou La Gravure en action, folie-vaudeville in 1 act, with Gosse and Morel
1826: Le Chiffonnier, ou le Philosophe nocturne, comédie en vaudevilles in five acts and in one day, with Emmanuel Théaulon
1826: Paris et Bruxelles, ou le Chemin à la mode, two-act comédie en vaudevilles, with Jean-Baptiste Gondelier and Théaulon
1826: Le Soufflet conjugal, one-act comédie en vaudevilles, with Théaulon
1827: Les Compagnons du devoir, ou le Tour de France, one-act tableau-vaudeville, with W. Lafontaine
1827: Le Bénéficiaire, comedy in five acts and one vaudeville, with Théaulon
1827: Jean de Calais, comedy in two acts, mingled with couplets, with Gabriel de Lurieu and Louis-Émile Vanderburch
1828: L'Oncle en tutelle, one-act comédie en vaudevilles, with Vanderburch

18th-century French dramatists and playwrights
19th-century French dramatists and playwrights